Boyito Mulder (born 23 August 1991) is a Dutch former competitive figure skater. He is a four-time Dutch national senior champion.

Programs

Results

References

External links

 

1991 births
Living people
Dutch male single skaters
Sportspeople from Groningen (city)